Frank Millar may refer to:
Frank Millar (politician, born 1925) (1925–2001), Northern Irish unionist politician
Frank Millar Jr, his son, journalist and former politician 
Frank Winfird Millar (1885–1944), New Zealand public servant and union official

See also
Frank Miller (disambiguation)
Al Millar (Franklin Allan Millar, 1929–1987), Canadian ice hockey goaltender